Carex steudneri is a tussock-forming species of perennial sedge in the family Cyperaceae. It is native to the eastern part of Africa from Ethiopia in the north to South Africa.

The species was described in 1876 by the botanist Johann Otto Boeckeler as a part of the work Linnaea. The type specimen was collected by Hermann Steudner in Ethiopia. There are two synonyms; Carex huttoniana described by Georg Kükenthal and Carex zuluensis by Charles Baron Clarke.

See also
List of Carex species

References

steudneri
Plants described in 1876
Taxa named by Johann Otto Boeckeler
Flora of Ethiopia
Flora of Kenya
Flora of Lesotho
Flora of Malawi
Flora of Mozambique
Flora of Sudan
Flora of Swaziland
Flora of Tanzania
Flora of Zimbabwe
Flora of South Africa